The 1957–58 Scottish Inter-District Championship was a  rugby union competition for Scotland's district teams.

This season saw the fifth formal Scottish Inter-District Championship.

South and Edinburgh District won the competition with two wins and a draw each.

1957-58 League Table

Results

Round 1

Edinburgh District: 

South:

Round 2

South: 

North and Midlands:

Round 3

Glasgow District: 

North and Midlands:

Round 4

Glasgow District: 

Edinburgh District:

Round 5

 North and Midlands: 

Edinburgh District:

South: 

Glasgow District:

Matches outwith the Championship

Other Scottish matches

Rest of the West: 

Glasgow District: 

North of Scotland District: 

Midlands District:

Junior matches

Edinburgh District: 

South of Scotland District: 

West: 

East:

Trial matches

Blues Trial: 

Whites Trial: 

Probables: 

Possibles:

English matches

Northumberland: 

Edinburgh District:

International matches

Cities District: 

Australia: 

South of Scotland District: 

Australia: 

North of Scotland District: 

Australia:

References

1957–58 in Scottish rugby union
Scottish Inter-District Championship seasons